Hotula Khan or Qutula Khan ( Traditional Mongolian:; ;) 

( 1111 – 1161) was a Khan of Khamag Mongol and the son of Khabul Khan, and thus great-uncle of the Genghis Khan, and the nephew of Khaduli Barlas who was the ancestor of Barlas Mongol Clan, where Central Asian conquer Timur originated and foundation of Timurid Empire.

Life 
Most of his life is described in The Secret History of the Mongols and Jami' al-tawarikh. He was fifth son of his father. He was described as brave and courageous ruler. He pursued alliance with Keraits, namely Toghrul against Tatars and Jin Dynasty. He pillaged Tatars in retaliation of Ambaghai and his own brother, Ökin Barkak's kidnapping and execution, along with his nephews Qadaan Taishi and Yesugei. Despite the fact that the Mongols thirteen times clashed with the Tatar leaders Qoton Baraq and Jali Buqa, they did not manage to achieve a decisive advantage. He was ambushed after returning from his raid by Dörben tribe and was assumed dead by Yesugei and his kinsmen. He later died fighting the Tatars, who were aided by Jin Dynasty in 1161.

Legacy 
No Mongol emerged as khan after him until Genghis Khan. His nephew Yesugei only supervised the Khamag Mongols until his death in 1171. He had two sons - Jochi and Altan. According to The Secret History of the Mongols, Altan denied requests for succeeding his father and submitted to Genghis Khan.

References 

Mongol khans
Military personnel killed in action
12th-century Mongol rulers
Tengrist monarchs